Alejo Gastón Montero (born 5 May 1998) is an Argentine professional footballer who plays as a midfielder for Agropecuario.

Career
Montero started his career with Vélez Sarsfield, having joined them in February 2009. Gabriel Heinze promoted the midfielder into the club's senior squad during 2018–19, initially selecting him as an unused substitute for a fixture with River Plate on 3 February 2019. A 1–1 draw with Huracán on 8 February saw Montero make his professional debut, coming off the bench in stoppage time in place of Leandro Fernández.

In July 2019, Montero left Vélez to join Primera B Nacional's Agropecuario on a free transfer. Vélez denied the latter, saying they had agreed a new contract with the player. However, Montero claimed that they had broken AFA rules which allowed him to depart. Montero filed a recurso de amparo court complaint for freedom of action which was initially denied, though the case would subsequently be won by him via an appeal; the AFA declared him a free player on 12 September, which Vélez appealed themselves. A month later, in October, Montero scored his first senior goal in a 1–1 draw with Independiente Rivadavia.

Career statistics
.

References

External links

1998 births
Living people
Footballers from Buenos Aires
Argentine footballers
Association football midfielders
Argentine Primera División players
Primera Nacional players
Club Atlético Vélez Sarsfield footballers
Club Agropecuario Argentino players